The International Association for Technology Trade (IATT) is a consortium of information technology organizations, strategic advisors, government agencies and corporate members seeking to generate successful global business opportunities – with a key focus on China and emerging economies. IATT runs ongoing trade missions to developing regions, sponsors and co-promotes conferences and symposia, and provides strategic services to companies entering and expanding into emerging markets.

Events

2006 Guangdong Province Educational Technology Buyers' Summit

In June 2006, IATT hosted a high-level delegation from the Guangdong Province Department of Education, visiting North America at summit meetings arranged by IATT in Toronto, ON; Washington, DC and San Jose, CA. Highlights included meetings with representatives from Discovery Communications, the Oracle Education Foundation and Adobe Systems among other ISTE 100 companies. ISTE was a co-organizer of the summit, designed to introduce leading educational technology companies in North America to potential buyers in China.

First Sino-American Forum of Intellectual Property Rights

Efforts in 2005 to forge a partnership with the Patent Protection Association of China (PPAC) under the direction of China’s State Intellectual Property Office (SIPO) resulted in the first-ever Sino-American Forum of Intellectual Property Rights, held in China’s booming Pearl River Delta. Attracting more than 500 government officials, business leaders and academics from throughout China and North America, IATT and PPAC co-organized the event.

2005 China Educational Technology Conference & Expo

During the same timeframe, and with its EdTech association partner ISTE, IATT co-organized what was identified as the world's largest educational technology conference and expo in Dongguan, attracting nearly 40,000 attendees in its first year with leading EdTech speakers and a small number of non-China exhibitors from the US, Canada and UK.

See also 

 China–United States trade war (2018–present)
 Intellectual property in China

Notes

International trade organizations
Business organizations based in the United States